Saint Francis D'Assisi High School is a school located in IC Colony, Borivali West, Mumbai, India. It is managed by the Franciscan Missionary Brothers, a Catholic religious society founded by Paulus Moritz, a German missionary. The school is recognized by the State Government of Maharashtra. It was established in 1908 and it is one of the largest high schools in Maharashtra, India.

The high school has an average of 10,000 students on its roster, from Standards 1 to 10. The curriculum followed in the school was previously that of the SSC exams. Since 2009, the school also has a separate wing which follows the ICSE curriculum. The SSC wing is an all boys school whereas the ICSE wing offers co-education.

The school is located on Mt. Poinsur, with a chapel located on the summit of the hill. The school has featured in numerous Indian television series and soap. It has two open air grounds on campus used for school assemblies, wedding ceremonies, cultural programs and movie shoots; and a 5 acre playground adjoining the adjacent Our Lady of Immaculate Conception Church, Mt. Poinsur. The playground is one of the largest open air field grounds in Mumbai and is capable of holding functions with more than 20,000 attendants. 

Apart from the high school and junior college, a boarding school is also present on campus. The school also runs an orphanage/residential institution for homeless children.

The school features several extra curricular activities such as the student council, RSP, Boys scouts and various sports.

The institute also has an engineering college under the University of Mumbai and runs a management wing off the main campus affiliated to Yashwantrao Chavan Open University.

History
The history of St. Francis D'assissi School and Orphanage dates back to 1908. Sebastian Pereira, Archbishop of Daman, who had his see at Colaba, Bombay and knew the Franciscan Missionary Brothers, visited Paulus-Moritz, Superior General of the CMSF to start an apostolic activity for the welfare of poor children of the Diocese of Bombay. He selected the location at Mt. Poinsur (known then as Mandpeshwar) in spite of it being a jungle. Mortiz took up residence in the balcony of the dilapidated church of the Immaculate Conception on 4 October 1908.

Saint Francis D'Assisi had its centenary celebrations in 2008 attended by former President of India, A.P.J. Abdul Kalam. In 1985 when the school had completed 75 years Giani Zail Singh, the then President of India, attended the celebrations.

External links

Official website

Franciscan high schools
Catholic secondary schools in India
Christian schools in Maharashtra
High schools and secondary schools in Mumbai
Borivali
Educational institutions established in 1908
1908 establishments in India